Argonestis is a monotypic moth genus in the family Lasiocampidae. The genus was erected by Vadim V. Zolotuhin in 1995. Its only species, Argonestis flammans, was described by George Hampson in 1893. It is found in the Indian state of Manipur.

References

Lasiocampidae
Moth genera
Monotypic moth genera